Illinka is a village in the Pokrovsk Raion, Donetsk Oblast (province) of eastern Ukraine.

Demographics
Native language as of the Ukrainian Census of 2001:
 Ukrainian 98.32%
 Russian 1.68%

References

Villages in Pokrovsk Raion